The Atlantic City Railroad was a Philadelphia and Reading Railway subsidiary that became part of Pennsylvania-Reading Seashore Lines in 1933.

History 
Effective 1 April 1889, the Philadelphia and Reading Railway consolidated all of its railroads in Southern New Jersey into the Atlantic City Railroad.

Speed records 
On 20 July 1904, the regularly-scheduled train no. 25, which ran from Kaighn's Point in Camden, New Jersey, to Atlantic City, New Jersey, with Philadelphia and Reading Railway class P-4c 4-4-2 No.334 and 5 passenger cars, set a speed record. During the short segment between Egg Harbor and Brigantine Jct, the train was reported to have reached .

Predecessor railroads

Camden, Gloucester & Mt. Ephraim Railway 

A  narrow gauge was required, as much of the right of way used existing city streets with sharp curves. Work began in January 1874 and the line from Kaighn's Point to Gloucester City opened on 14 February 1874. The line to Mount Ephraim Borough opened in May 1876. In the middle of November 1884, the Philadelphia and Reading Railway acquired the Camden, Gloucester & Mt Ephraim Railway.

Philadelphia and Atlantic City Railway 
During 1875, four of the Camden and Atlantic Board of Directors left, led by Samuel Richards who was an officer of the C&A for 24 years, to build a second railroad from Camden, New Jersey, to Atlantic City by way of Clementon. Incorporated on 24 March 1876.  narrow gauge was selected because narrow gauge was successful at the time and saved in lower operating cost. Work began in April 1877. The track work was completed in 90 days. On Saturday, 7 July 1877 the final spike was driven and the  line was opened. On 12 July 1878 the P&AC RY slipped into bankruptcy. The Philadelphia and Atlantic City Railway was acquired by the CNJ and the Philadelphia and Reading Railway for $1,000,000 on 20 September 1883. And the name was modified to Philadelphia and Atlantic City Railroad effective 4 December 1883. The Philadelphia and Reading Railway acquired full control on 4 December 1885.

Williamstown Railroad 
This railroad was chartered on 13 March 1871 by the owners of one glassworks in Williamstown to build a line from Atco to Williamstown, and later to Glassboro, New Jersey. The 9.5 mile line was completed in 1873. The line slipped into bankruptcy in November 1881. The Williamstown Railroad had graded a line to Glassboro NJ but the rail was only laid 1.7 miles to Robanna NJ. The Williamstown Railroad was acquired by the CNJ and the Philadelphia and Reading Railway on 6 October 1883 at foreclosure sale. And the name was modified to Williamstown & Delaware River Railroad effective 7 December 1883.

Williamstown and Delaware River Railroad 
In the summer of 1883, the Williamstown & Delaware River Railroad track was laid to Glassboro. Now the line was 15.73 miles long. Also in 1883 a branch 1.20 miles long was built in Glassboro NJ as the Glassboro Railroad to the Whitney Brother's glass works. The Philadelphia and Reading Railway acquired full control on 4 December 1885. In 1887 a new extension was built to Mullica Hill NJ.

Cultural context
At the end of the nineteenth century and the early decades of the twentieth century, railroads were primary channels for accessing New Jersey shore beaches. PRR property railroads carried beachgoers from Philadelphia and Camden.

Railroads acquired in 1901 
The Atlantic City Railroad was reincorporated on 14 June 1901 as a merger with other railroads......

Camden County Railroad 
The Camden County Railroad was incorporated on 17 September 1889 with the purpose of extending the ACRR's Gloucester Branch ex Camden, Gloucester & Mt Ephraim Railway between Mount Ephraim Borough and Spring Mills, home of the Bateman Manufacturing Company where two plants were in use constructing farm equipment.  As of 31 December 1890, 5 miles of railroad were completed south of Mt. Ephraim.  The remaining 2.19 miles were finished on 10 May 1891.  Spring Mills saw its first train during the third week in March, while the first carload of farm equipment and tools did not leave Bateman Manufacturing until the beginning of April.  Stations were constructed along the Camden County Railroad at Bellmawr, Runnemede, Glendora, Chews Landing formerly South Glendora, Blenheim, Blackwood, and Spring Mills, renamed Grenloch (in Gloucester Township, New Jersey ) upon completion of the line.  After construction was complete, the Camden County Railroad, which had been established with the sole purpose of constructing this extension, was leased to the Atlantic City Railroad. Atlantic City Railroad  Timetable No. 3, effective 14 April 1892, was the first to show trains operating on the Gloucester Branch between Mt. Ephraim and Grenloch.

ACRR Gloucester Branch
P-RSL Grenloch Branch

Cape May, Delaware Bay and Sewell's Point Railroad
This particular line existed from 1863 until the 1920s, and ran from Sunset Beach in Lower Township, around the Point to South Cape May (now known as South Meadows), into Cape May City, out to Sewell's Point (now the Coast Guard Training Center), and back around to Schellenger's Landing, where visitors could then connect to Philadelphia-bound trains.

Ocean City Railroad 
Ocean City Junction to Ocean City

Seacoast Railroad 
Winslow Junction to Tuckahoe, Sea Isle City and Cape May

Railroads acquired in the 1930s

Stone Harbor Railroad 
Acquired in April 1932, the SHRR ran from  Cape May Court House to Stone Harbor; it was merged with the PRSL in 1936.

Wildwood and Delaware Bay Short Line Railroad 
Acquired in July 1930, the W&DBSLRR ran from Wildwood Junction to Wildwood; it was merged with the ACRR (by then PRSL) in 1934.

Railroads operated or leased

Pleasantville & Ocean City Railroad 
9 June 1880, Pleasantville & Ocean City Railroad incorporated in New Jersey; William Massey, Pres. (Val)

26 October 1880, Pleasantville & Ocean City Railroad ( narrow gauge) opens between Pleasantville and Somers Point, N.J.; operated by Philadelphia & Atlantic City Railway; opening excursion runs from Philadelphia to Ocean City; Ocean City Association operates connecting steamboat between Somers Point and Ocean City. (Val, Lee)

May 1882, William Massey sells the Pleasantville & Ocean City Railroad to the West Jersey and Atlantic Railroad.

Brigantine Railroads 
7 August 1889 Brigantine Beach Railroad incorporated in New Jersey to build from Pomona on the Camden and Atlantic Railroad to Brigantine Island.

21 April 1890 Pomona Beach Railroad incorporated in New Jersey to build from Camden and Atlantic Railroad to the Atlantic City Railroad at Pomona, to connect the Brigantine Beach Railroad with the ACRR.

18 August 1890 Brigantine Beach Railroad and Pomona Beach Railroad are leased to Atlantic City Railroad.

27 January 1891 Pomona Beach Railroad consolidated with Brigantine Beach Railroad, that now runs from Brigantine Beach to Brigantine Junction 13.90 miles.

1893 Brigantine Transit Company built as an electric trolley line, The road extends along Brigantine Beach NJ a distance of six and one quarter miles.

27 June 1895 The secretary of Brigantine Transit Company, George H. Cook buys the Brigantine Beach Railroad at foreclosure sale.

1 April 1896 the Brigantine Beach Railroad reincorporated as Philadelphia & Brigantine Railroad; George H. Cook Pres.; The Philadelphia & Brigantine Railroad lease Brigantine Transit Company.

30 September 1897 Atlantic City Railroad canceled the lease of Philadelphia & Brigantine Railroad.

12 September 1903 Storm destroys trestle leading to Brigantine Island on Philadelphia & Brigantine Railroad. (Coxey)

9 October 1903 Philadelphia & Brigantine Railroad abandons all service. (Coxey)

Pennsylvania-Reading Seashore Lines 

On 2 November 1932, the Pennsylvania Railroad and Reading Company joined their southern New Jersey railroad lines into one company, The Pennsylvania-Reading Seashore Lines which the Pennsylvania Railroad had a 2/3 ownership, And the Reading Company had a 1/3 ownership.

On 15 July 1933, The Atlantic City Railroad leased the West Jersey & Seashore Railroad and changed its name to Pennsylvania-Reading Seashore Lines.

See also  

Central Railroad of New Jersey
New Jersey Southern Railroad
Pennsylvania Railroad
Reading Company
1896 Atlantic City rail crash
1922 Winslow Junction Train Derailment

References

External links
The Pennsylvania-Reading Seashore Lines Historical Society
The West Jersey Chapter of the NRHS

Companies affiliated with the Reading Company
Defunct New Jersey railroads
1889 establishments in New Jersey
Predecessors of the Pennsylvania-Reading Seashore Lines
Railway companies established in 1889
Railway companies disestablished in 1933
Former Class I railroads in the United States
Railroads transferred to Conrail
Standard gauge railways in the United States
3 ft 6 in gauge railways in the United States